The Lied für Sachsen-Anhalt (Song for Saxony-Anhalt) is a regional anthem of the German state of Saxony-Anhalt. The use of this anthem was encouraged by the first minister-president of the country to strengthen the feeling of cultural identity in the new-founded state.

Lyrics

Culture of Saxony-Anhalt
European anthems
German anthems